Leptadenia madagascariensis is a species of flowering plant in the family Apocynaceae, native to Madagascar and the Mozambique Channel Islands (Juan de Nova Island).

References

Asclepiadoideae
Flora of the Mozambique Channel Islands
Flora of Madagascar
Plants described in 1844
Taxa named by Joseph Decaisne